Boško Buha Theatre is a theater in Belgrade, the capital of Serbia.

History
It was founded in 1950 by Gita Predić-Nušić and Đurđinka Marković, as first Serbian professional theater for the children. It was named after Boško Buha, who was a young Partisan who used to be one of the greatest icons of World War II in the former Yugoslavia.

As of 2010, despite being one of twenty largest theaters in Belgrade, it is among the least popular.

References

External links
 

Theatres in Belgrade